Francesco Vicari (born 3 August 1994) is an Italian footballer who plays for  club Bari.

Club career
Born in Rome, Lazio region, Vicari was a player of the reserve team of Apulian club Taranto in 2011–12 season. In summer 2012 Vicari became a player of Novara's reserve. Vicari also made his Serie B debut in the last round of 2012–13 Serie B. He became a regular member of the first team since 2013. He followed the club relegated to Lega Pro in 2014 as well as promoted back to Serie B in 2015. In 2015–16 Serie B he wore No. 6 shirt.

On 9 July 2022, Vicari signed a two-year contract with Bari, which would be automatically extended in case of Bari's promotion to Serie A.

Career statistics

Club

References

External links
 AIC profile (data by football.it)  
 

Italian footballers
Taranto F.C. 1927 players
Novara F.C. players
S.P.A.L. players
S.S.C. Bari players
Serie A players
Serie B players
Serie C players
Italy youth international footballers
Italy under-21 international footballers
Association football defenders
Footballers from Rome
1994 births
Living people